Air Cavalry is a flight simulation video game developed by Synergistic Software. It was released by Cybersoft and GameTek for the Super NES in 1995.

Gameplay 

In the game, players control an advanced helicopter gunship. Flying above multiple types of terrain, players have to complete a number of objectives using different types of helicopters with different uses for each. Players can select from three theatres of operations with six or more objectives that increase in difficulty. Players can also practice in the training mission.

Reception 

Air Cavalry received generally mixed reviews. The four reviewers of Electronic Gaming Monthly commented that the low supply of ammunition and the unfailing accuracy of enemy fire make the game unpleasantly difficult, and that the Mode 7 sequences look poor. They nonetheless assessed the game as "decent", and said that enthusiasts of military games would find it very appealing.

GamePro, in contrast, praised the Mode 7 sequences and remarked that "Easy targeting and non-moving enemies makes this a better game for rookies than veterans." While they criticized the slow-moving helicopter and simplistic gameplay compared to the Strike series, they concluded that "if you're looking for a solid shooter, Air Cavalry comes to the rescue." Next Generation reviewed the game, and stated that "Success is as much of luck as skill, which makes it frustrating as well as overly repetitive."

References

External links
 Air Cavalry game information at MobyGames

1995 video games
Cybersoft (video game company) games
Flight simulation video games
Helicopter video games
Shoot 'em ups
Super Nintendo Entertainment System games
Super Nintendo Entertainment System-only games
Synergistic Software games
Video games developed in the United States
Video games set in the Middle East
Video games set in Indonesia
GameTek games
Multiplayer and single-player video games
Cooperative video games